Lola 8 is a computer developed by Ivo Lola Ribar Institute of SR Serbia in 1982 and announced for release in 1985. As the manufacturer's focus was CNC equipment, Lola 8 was built out of components they used for CNC machines.

Originally likely designed as the industrial controller, the computer initially had a keyboard completely orthogonally laid out rectangular key caps. This was possibly done as a result of using standard CNC keyboard components that need to minimize the entry of environmental dirt into the system. Later designs (model "8A") used standard keyboard arrangement and were available in a number of schools as educational computers.

Specifications
 CPU: Intel 8085
 ROM: 8 KB, containing BASIC
 Primary memory: 16 KB
 Secondary storage: cassette tape
 Sound: AY-3-8912
 I/O ports: cassette tape interface, composite and RF video out, audio and expansion connector

References

Personal computers